Fonfona is a village and the administrative centre (chef-lieu) of the commune of Tao in the Cercle of Koutiala in the Sikasso Region of southern Mali. The village is 45 km northwest of Koutiala.

References

Populated places in Sikasso Region